Pobrežje is a settlement south of Ptuj in the Municipality of Videm in eastern Slovenia. The area traditionally belonged to the Styria region. It is now included in the Drava Statistical Region.

In fields around the settlement remains of Roman-era graves and a structure, probably a villa rustica, have been found. The extent of the site has yet to be determined.

References

External links
Pobrežje on Geopedia

Populated places in the Municipality of Videm